Tom Snyder (born 1949) is an American animator, writer and producer known for the Squigglevision animation technique. His first success with this method was Dr. Katz, Professional Therapist, starring Jonathan Katz.

Snyder is a graduate of Swarthmore College, and as an educator he was inducted into the Association of Educational Publishers Hall of Fame. His educational work includes the series Science Court and educational computer software, such as FASTT Math. Since stepping down as chairman of "Tom Snyder Productions" he has worked on music composition and writing.

In 2011, Snyder teamed up again with Jonathan Katz to create an animated web series, ExplosionBus.com In 2016, he released a new category of audiobook called an AudioMusical. His first AudioMusical is titled Is Anyone All Right? distributed by Audible.com.

See also
 Soup2Nuts (formerly Tom Snyder Productions)

References

External links
 Explosion Bus official web page
 Tom Snyder game credits at MobyGames
 

American animators
American animated film producers
American television producers
Living people
Swarthmore College alumni
Squigglevision
Place of birth missing (living people)
1949 births